Wyvern St Edmund's is a coeducational secondary school located in Laverstock, near Salisbury in the English county of Wiltshire.

History
The school opened in 1972 as Highbury Secondary School, as a replacement for Highbury Avenue secondary modern school which was in a 1930s building at Highbury Avenue, Fisherton Anger, Salisbury. By 1994 there were 530 on the school roll.

In 1995, the school was renamed Wyvern College. Under the specialist schools programme of the 1990s and 2000s it was a Technology College, teaching all subjects but with emphasis on Science, Mathematics, Technology and Communications Technology; it operated in partnership with Wiltshire College Salisbury.

In 2003 the school assumed Voluntary Aided status and became a Church of England school. In April 2017, Wyvern College converted to academy status and joined the adjacent St Edmund's Girls' School in the Magna Learning Partnership, a multi-academy trust. From September 2018 the two schools operated as a single mixed school called Wyvern St Edmunds, pooling their leadership, staff and buildings, although retaining their separate legal identities.

In September 2022 the two schools formally and legally amalgamated as Wyvern St Edmund's.

References

External links
Wyvern St Edmund's
Wyvern College, archived in March 2018

Secondary schools in Wiltshire
Educational institutions established in 1972
1972 establishments in England
Academies in Wiltshire
Church of England secondary schools in the Diocese of Salisbury